Renaud Blanc (born 3 January 1991) is a Swiss male BMX rider, representing Switzerland at international competitions. He competed in the time trial event at the 2015 UCI BMX World Championships.

References

External links
 
 
 

1991 births
Living people
BMX riders
Swiss male cyclists
European Games competitors for Switzerland
Cyclists at the 2015 European Games
Cyclists from Geneva
21st-century Swiss people